Lycoris is a Greek word and it means "twilight". Other uses include:
Lycoris (plant), a genus of family Amaryllidaceae
Lycoris, a character of .hack the multimedia franchise
Lycoris (company), a software company, acquired by Mandriva in 2005
Lycoris Black, a character from the Harry Potter novels
Lycoris Recoil, an anime television series produced by A-1 Pictures